Transport and Golgi organization protein 6 homolog also known as transmembrane and coiled-coil domain-containing protein 7 is a protein that in humans is encoded by the TANGO6 gene.

References